The Bay Street Substation is an historic building in Victoria, British Columbia, Canada.  It is located downtown, at the intersection of Bay and Government Streets.

See also
 List of historic places in Victoria, British Columbia

References

External links
 

Buildings and structures in Victoria, British Columbia